Shipunikha is a rural locality (a selo) and the administrative center of Shipunikhinsky Selsoviet, Tretyakovsky District, Altai Krai, Russia. The population was 539 as of 2013. There are 9 streets.

Geography 
Shipunikha is located 37 km east of Staroaleyskoye (the district's administrative centre) by road. Palatnaya is the nearest rural locality.

References 

Rural localities in Tretyakovsky District